Carl Peter Brocco (January 16, 1903 – December 20, 1992) was an American screen and stage actor. He appeared in over 300 credits, notably Spartacus (1960) and One Flew Over the Cuckoo's Nest (1975), during his career spanning over 60 years.

Early years 
Brocco was born in Reading, Pennsylvania. He was the son of Mr. and Mrs. Peter Brocco.

Career 
Brocco acted on stage with the Walter Hampton Players. He debuted on Broadway in Centuries (1927); he also performed in The Merry Wives of Windsor (1938).

Brocco appeared as a criminal type in several episodes of Adventures of Superman. He holds the distinction of having been killed off in two of them, a relative rarity for villains in the series. In the first, The Secret of Superman, he deduces that Kent is Superman, but is killed in a police shootout soon after. In The Clown Who Cried, he falls off a building and Superman is unable to save him. He also appeared as "The Spectre" in The Phantom Ring, where the criminals developed a machine that can make them invisible. Finally, in that episode, he survives, albeit rather banged up by Superman. Brocco was also on two episodes of Combat!, "The Long Walk" in 1964 and "The Flying Machine" in 1966. He appeared as Claymare, an Organian council member, in the Star Trek episode "Errand of Mercy", which established the uneasy treaty of peace between the United Federation of Planets and the Klingon Empire.
In 1969, he played an artist on the TV series Adam 12.

Brocco displayed a comedic talent portraying Peter The Waiter for 8 episodes of The George Burns and Gracie Allen Show on CBS during its 1955–1956 New York City season.

Brocco played Colonel Matterson, a patient who used a wheelchair and had dementia, in the Academy Award-winning One Flew Over the Cuckoo's Nest (1975). He also appeared as the patient in the hospital, Mr. Eagane, in the Happy Days 1974 episode "Hardware Jungle". In 1983 he played Ali MacGraw's father in the epic TV miniseries The Winds of War.

Brocco lived for some 40 years in Laurel Canyon, in a 1920s Spanish style home on Laurel Canyon Blvd. near the Country Store. He had his ceramics studio in the ground floor, a source of income when he was blacklisted for a while during the red scare of the early 1950s.

Death
Brocco died from a heart attack in Los Angeles on December 20, 1992, aged 89.

Selected filmography

 Roar of the Dragon (1932) as Wireless Operator
 Devil and the Deep (1932) as Wireless Operator
 Stand By All Networks (1942) as Cab Driver
 The Return of Monte Cristo (1946) as Clerk
 Alias Mr. Twilight (1946) as Brick Robey
 The Lone Wolf in Mexico (1947) as Emil
 The Swordsman (1948) as Groom
 The Argyle Secrets (1948) as Scanlon
 The Vicious Circle (1948) as Dr. Georges Samosch
 The Saxon Charm (1948) as Cyril Leatham
 The Gallant Blade (1948) as Sgt. Jacques – Cadeau's Servant
 The Countess of Monte Cristo (1948) as Hotel Desk Clerk
 The Boy with Green Hair (1948) as Bit Part
 Appointment with Murder (1948) as Giuseppe Donatti
 Boston Blackie's Chinese Venture (1949) as Rolfe
 The Undercover Man (1949) as Johnny
 Search for Danger (1949) as Morris Jason
 Susanna Pass (1949) as Coroner Carter
 The Lady Gambles (1949) as Horse Player
 Flaming Fury (1949) as E.V. Wessman
 Jolson Sings Again (1949) as Headwaiter
 Post Office Investigator (1949) as Bruno Antista
 Miss Grant Takes Richmond (1949) as Prospective Home Buyer, Father of Triplets
 The Reckless Moment (1949) as Pete – Bartender
 Tension (1949) as Balew
 House by the River (1950) as Harry – Coroner
 Key to the City (1950) as Waiter
 Gunmen of Abilene (1950) as Henry Turner
 Guilty of Treason (1950) as Judge Vilmos Oltey
 Black Hand (1950) as Roberto Columbo
 Champagne for Caesar (1950) as Fortune Teller
 The Gunfighter (1950) as Card Player
 Peggy (1950) as Bob Winters
 The Breaking Point (1950) as Macho
 Three Secrets (1950) as Stephani
 The Killer That Stalked New York (1950) as Tom the Wino
 Belle Le Grand (1951) as Tyler
 Flame of Stamboul (1951) as Sadik Raschin
 Francis Goes to the Races (1951) as Dr. Marberry
 The Great Caruso (1951) as Father Bronzetti
 The Fat Man (1951) as Racetrack Bookkeeper
 Sirocco (1951) as The Barber
 Hollywood Story (1951) as Charles Rodale
 The Tall Target (1951) as Fernandina
 His Kind of Woman (1951) as Thompson's First Henchman
 Chain of Circumstance (1951) as Clerk
 Drums in the Deep South (1951) as Union Corporal
 Roadblock (1951) as Bank Heist Man
 The Whip Hand (1951) as Nate Garr
 Too Young to Kiss (1951) as Waiter
 Radar Men from the Moon (1952) as Krog
 Harem Girl (1952) as Ameen
 Mutiny (1952) as Sykes, gunner
 The Narrow Margin (1952) as Vincent Yost
 Young Man with Ideas (1952) as Butler
 Actor's and Sin (1952) as Mr. Herbert (segment "Actor's Blood")
 Cripple Creek (1952) as Cashier Ed
 Holiday for Sinners (1952) as Father
 Big Jim McLain (1952) as Dr. Carter
 The Ring (1952) as Barney Williams
 The Prisoner of Zenda (1952) as Johann
 Woman in the Dark (1952) as Nick Petzik
 The Bandits of Corsica (1953) as Angelo
 The Story of Three Loves (1953) as Bartender (segment "Mademoiselle")
 Invaders from Mars (1953) as Brainard – Wilson's Aide
 Ma and Pa Kettle on Vacation (1953) as Adolph Wade
 The Desert Song (1953) as Old Refugee
 El Alamein (1953) as Selim
 Duffy of San Quentin (1954) as Nealy
 Tobor the Great (1954) as Dr. Gustav
 Rogue Cop (1954) as George 'Wrinkles' Fallon
 The Atomic Kid (1954) as Comrade Mosley
 The Silver Chalice (1954) as Stall Keeper
 The Racers (1955) as Gatti
 Wyoming Renegades (1955) as Dawson
 I'll Cry Tomorrow (1955) as Doctor
 Diane (1956) as Court Painter
 Hot Blood (1956) as Doctor Robert Turchino
 Stranger at My Door (1956) as Saddler
 He Laughed Last (1956) as Al Fusary
 Black Patch (1957) as Harper
 Twilight Zone (1959) as Mr. Marshak in the episode “The Four Of Us Are Dying”
 Compulsion (1959) as Albert, Steiner's Chauffeur
 Elmer Gantry (1960) as Benny – Photographer
 Spartacus (1960) as Ramon
 Let No Man Write My Epitaph (1960) as Salesman at Florist Shop
 Underworld U.S.A. (1961) as Vic Farrar
 Fear No More (1961) as Steve Cresca
 A Public Affair (1962) as Leonard Lohman
 The Three Stooges in Orbit (1962) as Doctor Appleby
 Hemingway's Adventures of a Young Man (1962) as Headwaiter
 The Interns (1962) as Arnold Auer
 The Balcony (1963) as Judge
 The Pleasure Seekers (1964) as Arturo
 Dark Intruder (1965) as Chi Zang
 Our Man Flint (1966) as Dr. Wu
 The Russians Are Coming, the Russians Are Coming (1966) as Reverend Hawthorne
 Enter Laughing (1967) as Lawyer Peabody
 Games (1967) as Count, Party Guest
 In Enemy Country (1968) as Prisoner at Factory Yard
 Dr. Heidegger's Experiment (1969) as Dr. Heidegger
 Some Kind of a Nut (1969) as Mr. Suzumi
 Hail, Hero! (1969) as Old Man #1
 The Comic (1969) as Minister
 Gaily, Gaily (1969) as Swami
 A Time for Dying (1969) as Seth
 Johnny Got His Gun (1971) as Ancient Prelate
 What's the Matter with Helen? (1971) as Old Man
 Fuzz (1972) as Man with Garbage
 Papillon (1973) as Doctor
 The Killing Kind (1973) as Louise's Father
 Homebodies (1974) as Mr. Blakely
 One Flew Over the Cuckoo's Nest (1975) as Col. Matterson
 Raid on Entebbe (1976) as Mr. Scharf
 The One and Only (1978) as Autograph Hound
 Butch and Sundance: The Early Days (1979) as Old Robber
 Fighting Back (1982) as Donato
 Jekyll and Hyde... Together Again (1982) as Hubert Howes
 Twilight Zone: The Movie (1983) as Mr. Mute (Segment #2)
 Money to Burn (1983) as Harry
 Throw Momma from the Train (1987) as Old Man
 The War of the Roses (1989) as Elderly Mourner
 Other People's Money (1991) as Garfield's Office Valet

References

External links
 
 
 

 

1903 births
1992 deaths
American male film actors
American male television actors
American male stage actors
20th-century American male actors
Actors from Reading, Pennsylvania
Male actors from Pennsylvania